Giedrius Surplys (born 26 May 1980) is a Lithuanian politician. He served as Minister of Agriculture in the cabinet of Prime Minister Saulius Skvernelis from 15 May 2018 to 7 August 2019.

References 

Living people
1980 births
Place of birth missing (living people)
21st-century Lithuanian politicians
Ministers of Agriculture of Lithuania
Lithuanian Farmers and Greens Union politicians
Members of the Seimas